The Rocky Mountain Vibes are an independent baseball team of the Pioneer League, an MLB Partner League. They are located in Colorado Springs, Colorado, and play their home games at UCHealth Park.

As a result of a contraction of Minor League Baseball in 2021, the Pioneer League, of which the Vibes have been members since 2019, was converted from an MLB-affiliated Rookie Advanced league to an independent baseball league and granted status as an MLB Partner League. Prior to this, they had been affiliated with the Milwaukee Brewers in 2019 and 2020.

History
On June 21, 2017, David G. Elmore, president of Elmore Sports Group, announced a relocation plan involving several of its teams. The Helena Brewers Rookie Pioneer League franchise would move to Colorado Springs in 2019. The team would continue to compete in the league under a new nickname. The Triple-A Colorado Springs Sky Sox of the Pacific Coast League would relocate to San Antonio and continue in the PCL as the San Antonio Missions. The San Antonio Double-A Texas League franchise would relocate to Amarillo, Texas, as the Amarillo Sod Poodles.

A contest to determine the Pioneer League franchise's new name was announced in June 2018. The five finalists in the name-the-team contest were "Colorado Springs Happy Campers", "Colorado Springs Lamb Chops", "Colorado Springs Punchy Pikas", "Colorado Springs Throttle Jockeys", and "Rocky Mountain Oysters". The team's name, "Rocky Mountain Vibes",  was announced on November 19, 2018. Though not one of the finalists, the name is related to the proposed Happy Campers moniker in reference to the happy feelings or "good vibes" one may feel when enjoying outdoor activities.

Rocky Mountain began as affiliates of the Milwaukee Brewers. The Vibes played their first game on June 14 against the Orem Owlz as visitors, losing 3–0. Their first home game was played at UCHealth Park on June 21 against the Grand Junction Rockies, an 8–5 loss.

In conjunction with a contraction of Minor League Baseball in 2021, the Pioneer League was converted from an MLB-affiliated league to an independent baseball league and granted status as an MLB Partner League, with Rocky Mountain continuing as members. During the 2021 season, the Vibes served as an unofficial farm team for the Acereros de Monclova of the Mexican League, after the two sides signed an agreement allowing Rocky Mountain to host and develop a number of young talents in Monclova's organization. The partnership with Monclova was later renewed for the 2022 season.

Roster

References

External links

Pioneer League (baseball) teams
Sports in Colorado Springs, Colorado
Professional baseball teams in Colorado
Milwaukee Brewers minor league affiliates